In Italian design, the Radical period took place in the late 1960s, with a shift in style among the avant-garde. Probably the most notable result of this avant-garde period is the installation called "Superarchitettura", made in Pistoia in 1966. Another important exhibition dedicated to radical design in Italy was held at MoMA in 1972 ("Italy: The New Domestic Landscape").

The radical design movement included many artists, designers and architects from Florence, Turin, Naples, Milan, etc:

 Archizoom, Superstudio, UFO, 9999, Zziggurat (Florence) 
 LIBIDARCH, Studio 65, Ceretti-Derossi-Rosso, Piero Gatti-Cesare Paolini-Franco Teodoro. In addition, artists like Piero Gilardi, Guido Drocco, Franco Mello (Turin)
 Riccardo Dalisi (Naples)
 Gruppo Cavart: Piero Brombin and Michele De Lucchi (Padua)
 Gaetano Pesce
 Ugo La Pietra (Milan)

Another important studio was located in Milan and called "STUDIODADA". Members of STUDIODADA included: Ada Alberti, Dario Ferrari, Maurizio Maggi, Patrizio Corno, Marco Piva and Paolo Francesco Piva. Other professionals of that period were: David Palterer, Tomo Ara, Battista Luraschi, Bepi Maggiori, Alberto Benelli, Pino Calzana, etc.

Radical Design influenced Studio Alchimia and the Memphis group.

In addition, a movement called "Postmodernism" or "Neomodernism" was led by Alessandro Mendini, director of reviews like "Casabella", "Modo" and "Domus" from 1980 to 1985. Mendini's postmodernism inspired exhibitions like "L'interno oltre la forma dell'utile" (Interior space after the form of usefulness) held at the Triennale di Milano in 1980.

References 

Architecture in Italy
Italian design